The Squash Colombia Open is a squash tournament held in Cartagena, Colombia in February. It is part of the PSA World Tour.

Past results

References

External links
 SquashSite website
 PSA Squash Colombia Open 2016

Squash tournaments in Colombia